The Brentford & Isleworth Meeting House is a Friends meeting house (a Quaker place of worship) on Quaker Lane in Isleworth, Hounslow. It is listed Grade II* on the National Heritage List for England. The meeting for worship is held on Sundays at 10:30 am.

The building was originally built for the Quakers in 1785, and has been regularly extended since. The West London Quaker burial ground and a garden surrounds the house. The front wall of the house was badly damaged during the London Blitz in 1940.

References

External links

1785 establishments in England
18th-century Quaker meeting houses
Grade II* listed buildings in the London Borough of Hounslow
Grade II* listed religious buildings and structures
Quaker meeting houses in London